Teruko Kiriake (born 6 November 1996) is a Japanese sprint canoer. 

She qualified at the 2020 Summer Olympics, in the C-1 200 meters, and C-2 500 meters.   

She competed at the 2018 ICF Canoe Sprint World Championships, and at the 2019 and 2021 Canoe Sprint World Cup.

References

External links 
 Manaka Kubota Teruko Kiriake (JPN), AUGUST 30, 2018 Canoe Sprint Women s Canoe Double 500m Final at (imago-images.com)

Japanese female canoeists
Living people
1996 births
Canoeists at the 2020 Summer Olympics
Olympic canoeists of Japan
Sportspeople from Fukuoka Prefecture
People from Yame, Fukuoka
Canoeists at the 2018 Asian Games
Asian Games competitors for Japan